Brian Leo Muller (11 June 1942 – 12 December 2019) was a New Zealand rugby union player. A prop, Muller represented Taranaki at a provincial level, and was a member of the New Zealand national side, the All Blacks, from 1967 to 1971. He played 35 matches for the All Blacks including 14 internationals. He died on 12 December 2019 at the age of 77.

References

1942 births
2019 deaths
People from Eltham, New Zealand
New Zealand rugby union players
New Zealand international rugby union players
Taranaki rugby union players
Rugby union props
Rugby union players from Taranaki